Gorilla Theatre was a performing arts venue in the Drew Park area of Tampa, Florida.  Founded in 1990 by playwrights Aubrey Hampton and Susan Hussey, closing its doors in the summer of 2015. The 76-seat full-season theatre presents original dramas, musicals and revivals of classic works. The venue was also the home of an ongoing series of jazz concerts and the annual Gorilla Theatre's Young Dramatists' Project, which offers full-scale productions of original works by teenage playwrights.

References

External links 
 
 Wild About Ernie - Sean Sanczel's play about Ernie Kovacs
Coverage of the Gorilla Theatre’s production of "Bach at Leipzig"
Coverage of the Gorilla Theatre’s production of “A Picasso”
Coverage of the Gorilla Theatre’s production of “Jane Eyre”

Theatres in Tampa, Florida
Theatre companies in Florida
1990 establishments in Florida
Theatres completed in 1990